Osteomeles anthyllidifolia, commonly called Ūlei, eluehe, uulei, Hawaiian rose, or Hawaiian hawthorn, is a species of flowering shrub in the rose family, Rosaceae, that is indigenous to Hawaii (all islands but Kahoolawe and Niihau), the Cook Islands, Tonga, Pitcairn Island, and Rapa Iti, Taiwan and the Ryukyu islands of Japan.

Description
Osteomeles anthyllidifolia grows as either an erect shrub that reaches  or a spreading shrub. The compound leaves are alternately arranged on branches and divided into 15–25 leaflets. White flowers with five  petals form clusters of three to six on the ends of branches.

Habitat
It is a ruderal species, able to effectively compete with other plants on disturbed sites.

Uses

Medicinal
The leaves and root bark are used on deep cuts; the seeds and buds are used as a laxative for children.

Non-medicinal
The wood of a mature Osteomeles anthyllidifolia is very strong, and Native Hawaiians used it to make ke ō (harpoons) with which they caught hee (octopuses). Ihe pahee (javelins), ihe (spears),  ōō (digging sticks), hohoa (round kapa beaters) ie kūkū (square kapa beaters), ūkēkē (musical bows), and auamo (carrying sticks) were also made from the wood. Young, flexible O. anthyllidifolia branches were fashioned into the hoops of aei.  These were  bag nets that were used in conjunction with kalo (taro) as bait to catch schools of ōpelu (Decapterus macarellus). The fruit is edible and was used to make a lavender dye.

References

anthyllidifolia
Flora of Hawaii
Flora of the south-central Pacific
Flora of Tonga
Ruderal species